Marble Mountains may refer to:

 Marble Mountains (Vietnam)
 Marble Mountains (Siskiyou County), California, USA
 Marble Mountains (San Bernardino County), California, USA

See also
 Marble Mountain (disambiguation)